John Craig "Jackie" Robertson (15 July 1928 – 14 March 2014) was a Scottish professional footballer who played as a striker in the Scottish Football League for Ayr United and East Stirlingshire, and in the Football League for Portsmouth, York City and Barrow.

References

1928 births
2014 deaths
People from Aberdeen
Scottish footballers
Association football forwards
Ayr United F.C. players
Portsmouth F.C. players
York City F.C. players
Barrow A.F.C. players
East Stirlingshire F.C. players
Scottish Football League players
English Football League players